Koskela (lit. "rapids village") is a district in the city of Helsinki, Finland. There are about 3 300 inhabitants. The borough is surrounded by Käpylä, Kumpula, Vanhakaupunki, and Oulunkylä. Koskela is located in the subdivision of Vanhankaupungin peruspiiri, near the rapids close to the mouth of the Vantaa River. The earliest mention of the human settlement in Koskela dates back to 1417, which makes it the oldest part of Helsinki.

Koskela can be divided into two distinct areas: the small north side dominated by detached housing and the dense south side with apartment buildings. The streets of Puu-Koskela (wooden Koskela) have been named after municipalities in Uusimaa. Before the recession of the 90s, Koskela had many kiosks and stores. After the financial collapse, only one Alepa remained in the center of the apartment building district.

Although one of the tram depots is named Koskelan varikko, it isn't situated in the borough.

Koskela teenage murder
On December 4, 2020, a teenage murder occurred in Koskela that shocked the entire country. The victim of the homicide was a 16-year-old boy. Police suspect the perpetrators of three boys of the same age who were imprisoned in the Helsinki District Court on December 10 on suspicion of murder. The perpetrators and the victim already knew each other. According to police, the motive for the act was to punish the victim for some previous activity. Prosecutors have demanded an absolute prison sentence for perpetrators of suspected minors.

Politics
Results of the 2011 Finnish parliamentary election in Koskela:

Social Democratic Party   24.2%
True Finns   16.8%
Left Alliance   16.0%
Green League   15.3%
National Coalition Party   14.5%
Centre Party   3.8%
Christian Democrats   3.2%
Swedish People's Party   2.4%

References

Districts of Helsinki